Lucien-Rene Duchesne (9 March 1908, in Paris (15th arrondissement) — 14 October 1984, Le Chesnay), was mayor of la Celle-Saint-Cloud (Yvelines) from 1959 to 1981.

Biography

2nd world war

Made prisoner of war by the Nazis, then he was deported in a German camp during the Second World War (1939–45).

Political life

He was elected city mayor of la Celle Saint-Cloud (Yvelines, France) from 1959 to 1981.

Decorations

 Legion d'honneur
 Palmes academiques

Memorial

After his death some places were named:

 Avenue Lucien-Rene Duchesne (La-Celle-Saint-Cloud)
 Lycee Lucien-Rene Duchesne (49 avenue Maurice de Hirsch, 78170 La Celle Saint Cloud)
 Stadium Lucien-Rene Duchesne (La-Celle-Saint-Cloud)

See also

 la Celle-Saint-Cloud

1908 births
1984 deaths
Politicians from Paris
French prisoners of war in World War II
French politicians
Officers of the Ordre national du Mérite
World War II prisoners of war held by Germany